A general election was held in the U.S. state of Vermont on November 3, 2020. All of Vermont's executive officers will be up for election as well as Vermont's at-large seat in the United States House of Representatives. Primary elections were held on August 11, 2020.

United States House of Representatives

The incumbent representative is Democrat Peter Welch.

Governor

The incumbent governor is Republican Phil Scott. He beat Lieutenant Governor David Zuckerman in the general election.

Lieutenant Governor

Incumbent Progressive/Democratic Lieutenant Governor Dave Zuckerman (since 2017) declined to run for a third term, and instead ran for governor.

Democratic primary

Candidates

Nominee
Molly Gray, Vermont Assistant Attorney General

Eliminated in primary
Tim Ashe, President pro tempore of the Vermont Senate (also ran in Progressive primary)
Brenda Siegel, candidate for governor in 2018, opioid epidemic and Brattleboro hurricane relief activist, southern Vermont nonprofit founder and executive director (also ran in Progressive primary)
Debbie Ingram, Chittenden County State Senator

Declined
Shap Smith, former Speaker of the Vermont House of Representatives, candidate for lieutenant governor in 2016, attorney
David Zuckerman, incumbent lieutenant governor (ran for Governor)

Results

Republican primary

Candidates

Nominee
Scott Milne, Republican nominee for Governor in 2014, Republican nominee for US Senate in 2016, businessman

Eliminated in primary
Dana Colson Jr.
Dwayne Tucker, Contractor and Civil Engineer
Meg Hansen, former executive director of Vermonters for Healthcare Freedom
Jim Hogue, Vermont secession activist

Declined
Don H. Turner Jr., nominee for lieutenant governor in 2018, former minority leader of the Vermont House of Representatives

Results

Progressive primary
Incumbent Progressive lieutenant governor David Zuckerman is not running for a third term.

Candidates

Declared
Tim Ashe, President pro tempore of the Vermont Senate
Brenda Siegel, candidate for governor in 2018, opioid epidemic and Brattleboro hurricane relief activist, southern Vermont nonprofit founder and executive director
Cris Ericson, perennial candidate

Declined
David Zuckerman, incumbent lieutenant governor (running for governor)

Results

General election

Polling

Results

Secretary of State

The incumbent secretary of state is Democrat Jim Condos.

Democratic primary

Candidates

Declared
 Jim Condos, incumbent secretary of state

Republican primary

Candidates

Declared
H. Brooke Paige, perennial candidate.

Treasurer

The incumbent treasurer is Democrat Beth Pearce.

Democratic primary

Candidates

Declared
 Beth Pearce, incumbent treasurer

Republican primary

Candidates

Declared
Carolyn Whitney Branagan, former state representative to Franklin-1 (2003–2017) and former state senator to Franklin (2017–2019)

Attorney General

The incumbent attorney general is Democrat T. J. Donovan.

Democratic primary

Candidates

Declared
 T.J. Donovan, incumbent attorney general

Republican primary
The Republican nominee is H. Brooke Paige.

Candidates

Declared
H. Brooke Paige, perennial candidate
Emily Peyton, candidate for governor in 2018

Progressive primary

Candidates

Declared
Cris Ericson, perennial candidate, running for other statewide offices as well

Auditor

The incumbent auditor is Democrat/Progressive Doug Hoffer.

Democratic primary

Candidates

Declared
Doug Hoffer, incumbent auditor (also ran in Progressive primary)
Linda Joy Sullivan, state representative

Republican primary
No candidates filed for the Republican primary. Doug Hoffer won the nomination via write-in.

Progressive primary
Incumbent Democratic/Progressive Auditor Doug Hoffer also ran in the Progressive primary. Perennial candidate Cris Ericson ran for the Progressive nomination for auditor, as well as several other statewide offices.

Candidates

Declared
Doug Hoffer, incumbent auditor (also ran in Democratic primary)
Cris Ericson, perennial candidate

General election

Candidates
Doug Hoffer (D/P*/R), incumbent auditor
Cris Ericson (P*), perennial candidate

(*Hoffer won the Democratic and Republican nominations. Ericson, who is not a member of the Progressive Party, won the primary election, however the Progressive state committee endorsed Hoffer for reelection. Hoffer had previously been nominated by both the Democratic and Progressive Parties in elections from 2010 to 2018.)

State Legislature
All 30 seats in the Vermont Senate and all 150 seats of the Vermont House of Representatives were up for election. The balance of political power remained the same in each chamber with Democrats having large majorities in both, however Republicans made very small gains in both chambers. While those gains were small, they allowed Republicans to break the Democrat/Progressive supermajority in the state house. This could potentially lead to any veto from Governor Phil Scott being upheld under these new circumstances.

State Senate

House of Representatives

County offices
Some county level offices will be up for election. The balance of political power before and after the elections for each office was:

Addison County

Bennington County

Caledonia County

Chittenden County

Essex County

Franklin County

Grand Isle County

Lamoille County

Orange County

Orleans County

Rutland County

Washington County

Windham County

Windsor County

Notes

Partisan clients

References

External links
Candidates at Vote Smart 
Candidates at Ballotpedia
 
 
  (State affiliate of the U.S. League of Women Voters)
 
Results at The Indianapolis Star

 
Vermont